Hawkes Heights (or Mount Hawkes) is an ice-filled volcanic crater rising to  that dominates the southern part of Coulman Island, in the Ross Sea, Antarctica, and marks the island's summit. The feature was named by the New Zealand Geological Survey Antarctic Expedition (NZGSAE), 1958–59, for Captain William M. Hawkes, U.S. Navy, who took a leading part in early air operations from Williams Field near McMurdo Station, including long range photo reconnaissance and supply flights, and the first air landing at the South Pole. He was commander of one of the two planes which made the historic first flight from Christchurch to McMurdo Station on December 17, 1955. His air photos proved of great value to two NZGSAE parties to this part of Victoria Land. Mount Hawkes is also named for Hawkes, who was assigned to Air Development Squadron Six (VX-6) in 1955–56.

See also
 List of Ultras of Antarctica

References

External links
 "Hawkes Heights, Antarctica" on Peakbagger

Volcanoes of Victoria Land
Borchgrevink Coast
Volcanic craters